Sabah Jeayer, (born 26 May 1970)  is an Iraqi football forward who played for Iraq in the 2000 Asian Cup, Talaba SC, and Al-Quwa Al-Jawiya.

Sabah Jeayer was a talented forward, who is great in the air and also a goalscorer capable of rising to the big match occasion, with two goals at the 2000 Asian Cup.

He started his career with the Talaba SC youth team in 1986, before moving to Air Force club Al-Quwa Al-Jawiya in 1991 and then moving back to Al-Talaba in 1993. He was given his first call-up to the national team in 1992.

In 1995, he helped Talaba to the Asian Cup Winners Cup final and scored 14 goals to help Al-Quwa Al-Jawiya win the double in 1997.

He was a member of Iraq's disastrous World Cup qualifying campaign for France'98, but stormed back after three years in exile with a magnificent double over hosts Lebanon in the Asian Cup. He was recalled by Milan Zivadinovic, who called him his secret weapon, Sabah has become one of Iraq’s star players.

The trickle of goals, he has scored during his career were always celebrated with an acrobatic somersault.

International goals
Scores and results list Iraq's goal tally first.

References

External links
 
 
 11v11 Profile
 

Iraqi footballers
Al-Talaba SC players
Iraq international footballers
2000 AFC Asian Cup players
Living people
1970 births
Place of birth missing (living people)
Al-Shorta SC players
Association football forwards